The Navesink Formation is a 66 to 70 mya greensand glauconitic marl and sand geological formation in New Jersey. It is known for its Cretaceous period fossil shell beds and dinosaur bones.

Description
The Navesink Formation, named after Navesink, New Jersey, is typically found above the Mount Laurel Formation and under the Red Bank Formation. There is a 5 mya gap between the Navesink and Mount Laurel Formations.

The Navesink has the highest radon gas potential of the New Jersey geologic formations.

Sites
There are several locations where the Navesink Formation is visible including Poricy Park in Middletown, New Jersey which has several exposures along Poricy Brook. There is also exposure in Big Brook Park in Marlboro, NJ.

Paleofauna

References

Cretaceous geology of New Jersey
Maastrichtian Stage of North America